Riverton is a city in Fremont County, Iowa, United States, along the East Nishnabotna River. The population was 245 at the time of the 2020 census.

History
Riverton was laid out in 1870.

The 1881 robbery of the Sexton Bank at Riverton was initially suspected to be the work of Jesse James, but it was soon correctly attributed to the outlaw Poke Wells.

Geography
Riverton is located at  (40.686202, -95.567905) along the East Nishnabotna River.

Demographics

2010 census
As of the census of 2010, there were 304 people, 120 households, and 83 families residing in the city. The racial makeup of the city was 95.7% White, 0.7% African American, 0.7% Asian, 1.6% from other races, and 1.3% from two or more races. Hispanic or Latino of any race were 3.6% of the population.

There were 120 households, of which 32.5% had children under the age of 18 living with them, 54.2% were married couples living together, 10.0% had a female householder with no husband present, 5.0% had a male householder with no wife present, and 30.8% were non-families. 27.5% of all households were made up of individuals, and 10% had someone living alone who was 65 years of age or older. The average household size was 2.53 and the average family size was 3.08.

The median age in the city was 40.2 years. 26.6% of residents were under the age of 18; 4.6% were between the ages of 18 and 24; 24.3% were from 25 to 44; 27.7% were from 45 to 64; and 16.8% were 65 years of age or older. The gender makeup of the city was 51.6% male and 48.4% female.

2000 census
As of the census of 2000, there were 304 people, 125 households, and 76 families residing in the city. The racial makeup of the city was 98.68% White, 0.33% Asian, and 0.99% from two or more races.

There were 125 households, out of which 26.4% had children under the age of 18 living with them, 49.6% were married couples living together, 7.2% had a female householder with no husband present, and 38.4% were non-families. 33.6% of all households were made up of individuals, and 14.4% had someone living alone who was 65 years of age or older. The average household size was 2.43 and the average family size was 3.13.

27.0% are under the age of 18, 8.9% from 18 to 24, 24.7% from 25 to 44, 22.7% from 45 to 64, and 16.8% who were 65 years of age or older. The median age was 38 years. For every 100 females, there were 114.1 males. For every 100 females age 18 and over, there were 105.6 males.

The median income for a household in the city was $27,500, and the median income for a family was $46,250. Males had a median income of $28,000 versus $21,250 for females. The per capita income for the city was $12,854. About 11.0% of families and 16.5% of the population were below the poverty line, including 12.9% of those under the age of eighteen and 20.5% of those 65 or over.

Education
Riverton is within the Sidney Community School District.

Prior to 2016, Riverton was in the Farragut Community School District, which operated Nishnabotna High School. The Farragut district closed in 2016.

References

Cities in Fremont County, Iowa
Cities in Iowa